Woman in Flames (German: Weib in Flammen) is a 1928 German silent drama film directed by Max Reichmann and starring Olga Tschechowa, Alexej Bondireff and Ferdinand von Alten.

The film's sets were designed by the art director Alexander Ferenczy. It premiered at the Marmorhaus in Berlin.

Cast
 Olga Tschechowa as Gräfin Clarissa Thalberg  
 Alexej Bondireff as Graf Thalberg 
 Ferdinand von Alten as Baron Demeter von Thurzo  
 Arthur Pusey as Baron Alexander von Thurzo, sein Sohn 
 Hedwig Pauly-Winterstein as Baronin Livia Széchenyi  
 Ines Monlosa as Baronesse Lily Széchenyi  
 Mignon Georgian as Ilonka  
 Angelo Ferrari as Marchese di Terna  
 Hans Albers as Abteilungsleiter im Warenhaus

References

Bibliography
 Grange, William. Cultural Chronicle of the Weimar Republic. Scarecrow Press, 2008.

External links

1928 films
Films of the Weimar Republic
Films directed by Max Reichmann
German silent feature films
Bavaria Film films
German black-and-white films
German drama films
1928 drama films
Silent drama films
1920s German films